The Queen is a 2012 Iranian film directed by Mohammad Ali Bashe Ahangar

Cast 
 Milad Keymaram as Siavosh 
 Mostafa Zamani as Jamshid 
 Mehdi Soltani as Amjad 
 Hooman Barghnavard
 Homayoun Ershadi
 Hamid Reza Azarang as Saifollah 
 Malek Seraj
 Mojtaba Asvadian
 Hossein Ahangar as Mousa

Reception

Awards and nominations

References

External links

2010s war films
2010s Persian-language films
Iranian war films
Iran–Iraq War films